Wild horse (Equus ferus) is  a species of the genus Equus that includes domesticated and undomesticated subspecies.

 Przewalski's wild horse (Equus ferus przewalskii or Equus przewalskii), a rare and endangered subspecies of wild horse
 Eurasian wild horse (Equus ferus ferus), an extinct subspecies of wild horse
 Yukon wild horse (Equus lambei), an extinct horse species
 Feral horse, free-roaming descendants of domesticated horses

Wild horse or Wild horses may also refer to:

Geography
 Wild Horse, Alberta, an unincorporated community in Alberta, Canada
 Wild Horse, British Columbia or Fisherville, site of an 1864 Gold Rush boomtown
 Wild Horse, Colorado, an unincorporated village in Colorado
 Wild Horse Desert
 Wildhorse Township, Graham County, Kansas, United States
 Wildhorse Valley Airport, located in Harney County, Oregon, United States
 Wild Horse Valley AVA, a California wine region
 Wild Horse River, a tributary of the Kootenay River in British Columbia, Canada
 Wild Horse Creek (disambiguation)
 Wild Horse Butte, a butte of sedimentary rock in southeastern Utah
 Wildhorse Butte, a volcanic butte in Lincoln County, Idaho

Establishments
 Wildhorse Resort & Casino, a Native American casino in Oregon, United States
 Wildhorse Saloon, a dance club in Nashville, Tennessee, United States

Books
 Wild Horses, a 1994 novel by  Dick Francis
 Wild Horses (play), a 1952 farce by Ben Travers

Film and television
 Wild Horse (1931 film), Western (genre) film starring Hoot Gibson
 Wild Horses (1985 film), a TV movie starring Kenny Rogers and Pam Dawber
 Wild Horses (1995 film), Argentine film by Marcelo Piñeyro
 Wild Horses (2015 film), a 2015 American film by Robert Duvall
 "Wild Horses", the nineteenth episode of the anime series Cowboy Bebop

Music

Bands
 Wild Horses (US rock band), a band that originally featured Johnny Edwards and James Kottak
 Wild Horses (US country band), an American country music band
 Wild Horses (British band), a 1980s rock band

Albums
 Wild Horses (Wild Horses album), their 1980 debut album
 Wild Horses (Smokie album), a 1998 album by the English rock band Smokie
 WildHorse, a 2017 album by RaeLynn

Songs
 "Wild Horses" (Birdy song), a 2015 song by Birdy
 "Wild Horses" (Garth Brooks song), a 1990 song by Garth Brooks
 "Wild Horses" (Gino Vannelli song), a 1987 song by Gino Vannelli
 "Wild Horses" (Rolling Stones song), a 1971 song by the Rolling Stones
 "Wild Horses", 1953 pop song recorded by bandleader Ray Anthony and vocalist Jo Ann Greer
 "Wild Horses", a song by Natasha Bedingfield from the album Unwritten
 "Wild Horses", a song by Bishop Briggs from the album Bishop Briggs
 "Wild Horses", a song by Girls Aloud from the album Chemistry
 "Wild Horses", a song by Nik Kershaw from the album The Riddle
 "Wild Horses", a song by Prefab Sprout from the album Jordan: The Comeback
 "She Rides Wild Horses", a song from the album of the same name by Kenny Rogers

See also
 Horse (disambiguation)
 Wild (disambiguation)